Jefferson-Morgan School District is a diminutive, rural, public school district located in Greene County, Pennsylvania. It serves the boroughs of Jefferson, Rices Landing, and Clarksville. It also serves Jefferson and Morgan townships. According to 2000 federal census data, it served a resident population of 6,142. By 2010, the District's population declined to 5,895 people. in 2010, the educational attainment levels for the population 25 and over were 87.0% high school graduates and 13.7% college graduates. In 2009, the District residents’ per capita income was $16,304, while the median family income was $38,728. In the Commonwealth, the median family income was $49,501 and the United States median family income was $49,445, in 2010. The School District reports 825 students in 2012. Whites make up 97% of the student body, blacks make up nearly 2%. The teacher-student ratio is 13:1. Thirty-seven percent of the students qualify for free or reduced-price lunch prices. "J-M" are also known for their many wins and loses against the Carmichaels Area School District.

Jefferson-Morgan School District operates two schools: Jefferson-Morgan Elementary School and Jefferson-Morgan Middle/Senior High School. The District is often referred to locally as "J-M" or "Jeff-Morgan." Jefferson-Morgan High school students may choose to attend Greene County Career and Technology Center for training in the construction and mechanical trades. The Intermediate Unit IU1 provides the District with a wide variety of services like specialized education for disabled students and hearing, speech and visual disability services and professional development for staff and faculty.

Extracurriculars
Jefferson-Morgan School District offers a variety of clubs, activities and an extensive sports program. Eligibility.

Sports
The District funds:

Boys
Baseball - A
Basketball - AA
Football - A
Golf - AA
Wrestling	- AA

Girls
Basketball - AA
Softball - A
Volleyball - A

Middle School Sports

Boys
Basketball
Football
Wrestling	

Girls
Basketball
Softball
Volleyball

According to PIAA directory 2019

References

External links
 Jefferson-Morgan School District website

School districts in Greene County, Pennsylvania
Greene County, Pennsylvania
Education in Greene County, Pennsylvania